Dietmar Schweninger is an Austrian para-alpine skier. He represented Austria at the 1980 Winter Paralympics, at the 1984 Winter Paralympics and at the 1988 Winter Paralympics. In total, he won two gold medals and two bronze medals in alpine skiing.

He also competed in the Men's giant slalom for single-arm amputees event in disabled skiing at the 1984 Winter Olympics, a demonstration sport during the 1984 Winter Olympics.

Achievements

See also 
 List of Paralympic medalists in alpine skiing

References 

Living people
Year of birth missing (living people)
Place of birth missing (living people)
Paralympic alpine skiers of Austria
Austrian male alpine skiers
Austrian amputees
Alpine skiers at the 1980 Winter Paralympics
Alpine skiers at the 1984 Winter Paralympics
Alpine skiers at the 1988 Winter Paralympics
Medalists at the 1980 Winter Paralympics
Medalists at the 1984 Winter Paralympics
Medalists at the 1988 Winter Paralympics
Paralympic bronze medalists for Austria
Paralympic gold medalists for Austria
Paralympic medalists in alpine skiing
20th-century Austrian people